The surname Kuba may refer to:

Filip Kuba (born 1976), Czech professional ice hockey defenceman in the NHL
Ludvík Kuba (1863–1956), Czech artist and musician
Martin Kuba (born 1973),  Czech politician
, Japanese football player
, Japanese football player

Japanese-language surnames
Czech-language surnames
Surnames from given names